Deuterotinea auronitens is a moth in the family Eriocottidae. It was described by Daniel Lucas in 1956. It is found in Morocco.

References

Moths described in 1956
Eriocottidae
Lepidoptera of North Africa